Eighth Avenue Place is a  twin-tower building complex located in downtown Calgary, Alberta, Canada. The complex includes a 49-storey  East tower, 40-storey  West office tower, and a three-storey indoor urban park.

The complex is housed on the site of the former Penny Lane Mall, originally intending to keep the historic name as "Penny Lane Towers", the project has since been renamed.

Construction
Demolition of the old mall was completed in September 2007. Excavation of the parkade below the building commenced in December 2007 and construction of the 49-storey east tower, and the parkade begun in Summer 2008. Eighth Avenue Place East was completed in 2011 and is currently the fifth-tallest building in Calgary. Eighth Avenue Place West was completed later in 2014.

Design
The structures, designed by Gibbs Gage Architects to have a Rocky Mountain theme, with a western facing pale-green glass wall mimicking mountain waters and glaciers. The remainder of the building adopts a dark gray-layered appearance representing the shifting tectonic plates that built the mountains. The complex connects to the Plus 15 skywalk system, and contains a six-level underground parkade with 1,141 parking stalls. The buildings also feature landscaped terraces and plazas, a  green roof, and an atrium winter garden.

Eighth Avenue Place would win the 2018 BOMA Canada Earth Award for excellence in resource preservation and environmentally sound commercial building management for the Office Building class.

Penny Lane Mall controversy
Prior to construction, concerns had been raised over the destruction of the 94-year-old Penny Lane Mall; however, the City of Calgary approved the project in March 2006.

Sustainability
Eighth Avenue Place has been certified LEED Platinum for Core and Shell.

Gallery

See also
List of tallest buildings in Calgary

References

External links

 Eighth Avenue Place Website
 Eighth Avenue Place at EllisDon.com

Buildings and structures in Calgary
Skyscrapers in Calgary
Twin towers
Skyscraper office buildings in Canada